Kilimanjaro is a fast food restaurant chain in Nigeria which opened in 2004 and has its headquarters in Port Harcourt. The restaurant is one of the fastest-growing in Nigeria. Today it has over 51 outlets across Nigeria, including the capital city of Abuja, Lagos, and other parts of the federation.

Kilimanjaro is owned by Sundry Foods' restaurant brands, and they are operating in the Quick Service Restaurant (QSR) sector. Kilimanjaro has since inception established itself as a force to reckon with in the space, and it is recognized as one of the fastest-growing restaurant brands in Nigeria, with over 48 stores operating in different locations.

References

Restaurants in Lagos
Fast-food chains of Nigeria
Restaurants established in 2004
2004 establishments in Nigeria
Companies based in Port Harcourt